Haken may refer to:

 Haken (band), an English progressive metal band
 Haken (employment), a type of labor contract in Japan
 Haken manifold, a type of 3-manifold named after Wolfgang Haken
 Eduard Haken (1910–1996), Czech operatic bass
 Hermann Haken (born 1927), physicist known for his contributions to laser theory and Synergetics
 Rianne ten Haken (born 1986), Dutch model
 Wolfgang Haken (1928–2022), German mathematician
 Shiluach haken, a mitzvah in the Torah